SS Grace Abbott was a Liberty ship built in the United States during World War II. She was named after Grace Abbott, an American social worker who specifically worked in improving the rights of immigrants and advancing child welfare, especially the regulation of child labor.

Construction
Grace Abbott was laid down on 29 August 1942, under a Maritime Commission (MARCOM) contract, MCE hull 919, by the Bethlehem-Fairfield Shipyard, Baltimore, Maryland; she was sponsored by Mrs. J.E. Schmelzer, the wife of the technical assistant to the vice chairman of MARCOM, and was launched on 10 October 1942.

History
She was allocated to Calmar Steamship Corp., on 17 October 1942. On 5 December 1946, she was laid up in the National Defense Reserve Fleet, Astoria, Oregon. On 14 August 1967, she was sold for scrapping to American Ship Dismantlers, Inc., for $47,500. She was removed from the fleet on 6 September 1967.

References

Bibliography

 
 
 
 

 

Liberty ships
Ships built in Baltimore
1942 ships
Astoria Reserve Fleet